Samuel Martins Torres Santiago Mira (born 17 July 1979), better known by his stage name Sam the Kid (STK), is a Portuguese rapper and producer from Chelas, in the civil parish of Marvila, Lisbon.

Early life 
Sam the Kid's music was primarily influenced by 93 'til Infinity (1993). Sam the Kid's music is noted for a creative and extensive use on sampling, using his primary producing equipment, the MPC.
In 1994, after leaving secondary school Escola Secundária D. Dinis in Lisbon at 15 years old, Mira established his first group, "Official Nasty" with school-friends Daddy-O-Pop, 2 Much and Sheriff, appearing in three concerts before dissolving in 1996, though they were still performing informally around 2004/2005.

Music career 
Sam the Kid released his first album Entre(tanto) in 1998. His second album Sobre(tudo), released in 2001, attracted the attention of then recently created Loop Recordings, who offered him a contract. It was in 2002, with the release of his third album, an instrumental record called Beats Vol. 1: Amor, that Sam the Kid began to enjoy a significant level of success; the album was considered by fans and critics to be one of the greatest Portuguese releases of the year. The album featured the song "Não Percebes", one of the biggest Portuguese rap hits, that touched on the issue of the "us vs. them" mentality in the genre.

In 2006, the artist released Pratica(mente), an album praised by critics as one of the most ambitious of the genre made in the country, a record that is still well remembered by fans.

Sam the Kid is considered to be one of the most important names of Portuguese hip hop, and one of the "most historic participants and drivers" of the genre in the country. In 2008, the musician was nominated for the second time for the MTV Europe Music Awards, along with Rita Redshoes, Buraka Som Sistema, Vicious Five and Slimmy. The artist was featured in a documentary named "Dicas do Vinil, com Sam The Kid", a work produced by public service broadcasting channel RTP.

The artist has been noted for taking a "radically open and eclectic" approach on his efforts to expand his audience, as well as refusing to sing in English, as did many of his contemporaries, when trying to break into more profitable markets. Sam started a new project named TV Chelas, a YouTube platform dedicated to Portuguese hip hop. The channel publishes content such as uncompleted music by Sam and other artists, podcasts, interviews and archived material, being one of the many new vehicles of promotion and critique of Portuguese-made hip hop, R&B and electronic music in the country.

Orelha Negra 
Since 2009 Sam The Kid is part of the band Orelha Negra, where is plays synths and voice samples using MPC. The other band members are Francisco Rebelo (bass and guitar), Fred Ferreira (drums), João Gomes (keyboards and synths) and DJ Cruzfader (turntables).

Orelha Negra have released 3 studio albums and 2 mixtapes.

Discography 

 1999 Entre(tanto)
 2001 Sobre(tudo)
 2002 Beats Vol 1: Amor
 2004 Sobre(tudo) (Special Edition)
 2005 MadVision 
 2006 Pratica(mente)
 2008 Pratica(mente) (Special Edition)
 2009 Festival Silêncio Live Concert album 
 2010 Instrumentais 2010
 2010 O Crime Do Padre Amaro Soundtrack
 2010 Untitled Album 
 2011 Untitled Mixtape 
 2012 'Brinde' – Mixtape 
 2012 Untitled Album 
 2013 Untitled Mixtape 
 2016 "16.1.2016 – Concerto dos Orelha Negra no CCB"

See also 
 Music of Portugal
 Hip hop Tuga

References

Sources

External links 
 
 

 
1979 births
Hip hop record producers
Portuguese rappers
Underground rappers
Hip hop dancers
Breakdancers
Portuguese record producers
20th-century Portuguese male singers
21st-century Portuguese male singers
Living people
Portuguese male film actors
Portuguese male singer-songwriters
Singers from Lisbon
Music video directors
Music video codirectors